The canton of Luzy is an administrative division of the Nièvre department, central France. Its borders were modified at the French canton reorganisation which came into effect in March 2015. Its seat is in Luzy.

It consists of the following communes:
 
Avrée
Cercy-la-Tour
Charrin
Chiddes
Fléty
Fours
Isenay
Lanty
Larochemillay
Luzy
Maux
Millay
Montambert
Montaron
Montigny-sur-Canne
Moulins-Engilbert
La Nocle-Maulaix
Poil
Préporché
Rémilly
Saint-Gratien-Savigny
Saint-Hilaire-Fontaine
Saint-Honoré-les-Bains
Saint-Seine
Savigny-Poil-Fol
Sémelay
Sermages
Tazilly
Ternant
Thaix
Vandenesse
Villapourçon

References

Cantons of Nièvre